Margaret Bechard (born 1953) is an American author of contemporary and science fiction for children and young adults.

Biography
Bechard was born in 1953 in Chico, California.  She received her bachelor's degree in English literature from Reed College in 1976.  She is married to Lee Boekelheide and they have three sons and four grandchildren. She lives in Tigard, Oregon.
 
Bechard served as the Young People's Literature Chair of the 2006 National Book Award Committee.  Her books are published in English, French, Swedish and Korean.  She teaches in the MFA in Writing for Children and Young Adults program at Vermont College of Fine Arts.

Awards
In 1996, Star Hatchling, a middle grade novel about first contact, received the Eleanor Cameron Award, a Golden Duck Award for Excellence in Children's Science Fiction.

Hanging on to Max, a story about a teenage father, was an ALA Best Book for Young Adults and School Library Journal Best Book of the Year in 2004.

Bibliography
My Sister, My Science Report  (1990)
Tory and Me and the Spirit of True Love  (1992)
Really No Big Deal  (1994)
Star Hatchling  (1995)
My Mom Married the Principal  (1998) - a sequel to Really No Big Deal
If It Doesn't Kill You  (1999)
Hanging on to Max  (2002)
Spacer and Rat  (2005)

References

interviews
Leitich Smith, Cynthia. "Author Interview: Margaret Bechard on Spacer and Rat. Cynsations. February 10, 2006.

External links

 :sv:Margaret Bechard
Penguin Press: Biography: Margaret Bechard
 

American children's writers
Reed College alumni
People from Tigard, Oregon
1953 births
People from Chico, California
Living people
Writers from California
Writers from Oregon
20th-century American writers
20th-century American women writers
21st-century American writers
21st-century American women writers
American women children's writers